Sepia irvingi is a species of cuttlefish native to the southeastern Indian Ocean, specifically western Australia, from Cockburn Sound to North West Shelf. It lives at a depth of between 130 and 170 m.

Sepia irvingi grows to a mantle length of 100 mm.

The type specimens were collected off Garden Island, Cockburn Sound, Port Royal, King George Sound, and Warnbro Sound in South Africa. They are deposited at the Western Australian Museum in Perth.

References

External links

Cuttlefish
Fauna of Western Australia
Molluscs described in 1909